MS2 or MS-2 may refer to:

Science and technology 
 Bacteriophage MS2
 Metre per second squared (ms−2; m/s²), a unit of acceleration
 Lockheed Martin Maritime Systems & Sensors
 Tandem mass spectrometry (MS²)
 MegaSquirt2, a type of MegaSquirt electronic fuel injection controller
ms2, an open source molecular simulation software

Transport 
 Mighty Servant 2, a heavy-lift ship
 Mississippi Highway 2
 Progress MS-02, a spacecraft
 Soyuz MS-02, a spacecraft
 Southern Railway (U.S.) Class Ms-2, a locomotive

Video games 
 MapleStory 2
 Mass Effect 2
 Metal Slug 2

Other uses 
 Mississippi's 2nd congressional district
 Project MS-2, a con perpetrated in 2002

See also

 MS-II, a proposed rocket stage
 
 
 MS 2000 (disambiguation)
 MS20 (disambiguation)
 MS 22 (disambiguation)
 MSMS (disambiguation)
 MSS (disambiguation)
 MS (disambiguation)
 2 (disambiguation)